Louise Elisabeth Bachofen-Burckhardt (October 8, 1845 – February 21, 1920) was a Swiss philanthropist. She is known for her art collection that she bequeathed to the Kunstmuseum Basel in Switzerland.

Biography
Bachofen-Burckhardt was born in 1845 in the Daig. She married anthropologist and antiquarian Johann Jakob Bachofenat age 25.  After his death, she expanded his art collection with the assistance of German art historian Wilhelm von Bode, with the goal of transforming the City of Basel's public art collection.

During the last decades of her life, she collected about 300 paintings from the late Middle Ages to the 20th century, including works by artists Bartolomeo Vivarini, Jan Breughel the Elder, Hans Memling, Hans Schäufelin or Lucas Cranach the Elder. In 1904, she donated all of the works to a foundation in her late husband's name, with the Kunstmuseum Basel as its sole beneficiary. Rudolf Burckhardt wrote a catalog of her collection that was published in 1907.

Legacy
From 2019 to 2020, the Kunstmuseum Basel ran a special exhibition honouring Bachofen-Burckhardt, 100 years after her death.

References

1845 births
1920 deaths
Women art collectors
People from Basel-Stadt